Robbie Miller is an Australian singer. In 2013, Miller won Triple J Unearthed National Indigenous Winner at the National Indigenous Music Awards 2013 with his song "Don't Go Walking Away" and an APRA Award in 2017 for "The Pain". Miller released his debut studio album in February 2021.

Career

2002-2018: Early years and EPs
Miller first picked up a guitar in 2002 and soon after started writing and recording music. His passion saw him graduate music from Queensland University of Technology in 2010.

In 2013, he released the singles "Don't Go Walking Away" and "Oh Lord". At the National Indigenous Music Awards 2013, he was the Triple J Unearthed National Indigenous Winner and Miller earned a place on tour with The Paper Kites while "Don't Go Walking Away" gained national airplay.

Miller spent most of 2014 and 2015 working away on his debut EP The Faster The Blood Slows.

In October 2014, Miller released "Sunday", the lead single from the EP. The EP was released in October 2015 in conjunction with second single "The Pain".

In 2016, Miller released "Road" and "Fire" from his second EP Closer to Home.

At the APRA Music Awards of 2017, Miller won Blues & Roots Work of the Year for "The Pain".

2019-present: Little Love
In 2019, Miller began releasing singles from his debut studio album with "The Come Down" and "Show Your Skin" with "Bitterness" released in April 2020.

In February 2021, Miller released his debut studio album Little Love. Miller worked with producer Alex Henriksson and sound engineer Matt Neighbour.

On making the album, Miller said "There is truth in every lyric, meaning behind every melody, feeling in every hum. Little Love is an album that wraps itself around my life for the last 3 years. There is an honesty in the album that I never truly sang or wrote about until this album. Giving myself up in a way that has always terrified me. There were truths I had to confront and lessons that needed to be learnt. I had to own who I was but most importantly own who I wasn't and truthfully, at times that hurt."

Discography

Albums

Extended plays

Singles

As lead artist

As featured artist

Awards and nominations

APRA Awards
The APRA Awards are presented annually from 1982 by the Australasian Performing Right Association (APRA), "honouring composers and songwriters".

|-
| 2017 || "The Pain" (Robbie Miller, Nathan Morrison) || Blues & Roots Work of the Year || 
|-
| 2022 || "Catch Me" || Most Performed Blues and Root Work ||

National Indigenous Music Awards
The National Indigenous Music Awards (NIMA) recognise excellence, dedication, innovation and outstanding contribution to the Northern Territory music industry.

|-
| National Indigenous Music Awards 2013
| "himself"
| Triple J Unearthed National Indigenous Winner
|

References

Indigenous Australian musicians
APRA Award winners
Living people
Year of birth missing (living people)